Card holder or cardholder  may refer to:
A person who owns a card, such as a cardholder of a credit card or debit card
A device which holds a card, such as a SIM card

See also
 Card (disambiguation)
 Holder (disambiguation)